William Kapell (September 20, 1922October 29, 1953) was an American classical pianist who recorded for RCA Victor.

Recordings

Many of Kapell's recordings were originally issued as 78RPM records.  Some were issued on LP, but by 1960, all of Kapell's commercial recordings were out of print.  RCA reissued Beethoven's Concerto No. 2 and Prokofiev's Concerto No. 3 on LP in the early 1970s, and bootlegged copies of the commercial recordings and unlicensed recordings of "live" performances circulated among collectors.  
 
In the 1980s, RCA Victor  released two compact discs of Kapell's recordings, including the Prokofiev Third and Khatchaturian piano concertos, and an all-Chopin disc.

A nine CD survey, The William Kapell Edition, released by RCA Victor  in 1998 contains all of the pianist's authorized recordings with that label, several previously unreleased tracks, and an interview. The set sold well internationally and sparked a revival of interest in Kapell's artistry.

In 1999 Philips Classics included Kapell's studio performances of Prokofiev and Rachmaninov with Dorati in Dallas, and Steinberg and Reiner in Philadelphia along with the solo studio performances of works by Albeniz, Bach, Chopin and Liszt as part of their 200-CD Great Pianists of the 20th Century set.

In addition, recordings taken from radio broadcasts of live performances have been issued on several labels, including Kapell ReDiscovered, which documents his final appearances.

Discography
The listing below contains only Compact Disc releases and does not contain 78rpm, LP, Cassette, or 8-track tape releases.

References
Primary Article Source

Kapell